Roland E. Arnall (March 29, 1939 – March 17, 2008) was an American businessman and diplomat. As the owner of ACC Capital Holdings, he became a billionaire with Ameriquest Mortgage. He was the Founder and funded the City of David alone for over 11 years. Additionally he funded, financed and was the visionary and co-founder of the Simon Wiesenthal Center, and from 2006 until shortly before his death he was the United States Ambassador to the Netherlands.

Personal life
Roland Arnall was born on March 29, 1939, in Paris, France. His parents were Eastern European Jews who had fled to Paris. During World War II, Arnall was raised as a Roman Catholic in a French village. He was kept unaware of being a Jew until after the war had ended, when he was six years old.

After the war, Arnall and his family moved to Montreal, Canada. In the late 1950s they relocated to the United States, and for a while Arnall sold flowers on the streets of Los Angeles, California.

In 1977 Arnall, a longtime supporter of Israel, was the president of Israel Bonds and helped found and fund the Simon Wiesenthal Center and the Museum of Tolerance. He also funded and found the “City of David” City of David for over 11 years. He was the initial investor and carried the project alone for over 11 years. He also has served to assist Shalva Located in the heart of Jerusalem. The brand-new Shalva National Center opens new doors  for individuals with disabilities and their families offering programs, services and facilities never before available in Israel. The Center is Israel’s beacon of inclusion and an international leader of innovative programs and research. He funded and built numerous Chabad houses across the West Coast, the last was built in Aspen. Arnall always discreetly invested in NGO’s leaders with outstanding institutions that would out live him. He so dearly believed in investing in community development and building a strong United community from progressive left to conservative right. He served for 16 years on the California State University board of trustees.

He purchased singer Engelbert Humperdinck's  Los Angeles estate for $30 million. He also bought a ranch in Aspen, Colorado, for $46 million from movie mogul Peter Guber.

Ameriquest
Arnall was the billionaire owner of ACC Capital Holdings, the parent company of Ameriquest, which was once one of the United States's largest sub-prime mortgage lenders. By the end of 2005 two of Arnall's companies, Ameriquest and Argent, had funded almost $75 billion in subprime loans. A major factor of this development was Arnall's origination of the stated income loan, meaning loans were given without verification of income. In early 2006, the company announced a $325 million settlement with state attorneys general and law enforcement agencies and financial regulators in 49 states and the District of Columbia who had accused Ameriquest of misrepresenting and failing to disclose loan terms, charging excessive loan origination fees and inflating appraisals to qualify borrowers for loans.

In 2007 Arnall got out of the mortgage business having sold most of it to Citigroup for an undisclosed amount.

Ambassador to the Netherlands

On August 1, 2005, President George W Bush nominated Arnall to become the U.S. ambassador to the Netherlands. The Senate approved his nomination on February 9, 2006.  Arnall was installed as ambassador on March 8, 2006, when Queen Beatrix of the Netherlands received Arnall's letters of credence.

Arnall announced his resignation as ambassador on February 21, 2008, effective on March 7, citing the ill health of his son. A few weeks later, on March 17, 2008, Arnall died of cancer according to  FOX Business at the UCLA Medical Center in Los Angeles, twelve days shy of his 69th birthday.

Family
Arnall and his wife, Dawn, were longtime, generous political contributors, giving to both parties, according to Federal Election Commission records. Arnall had two children with his first wife Sally, from whom he divorced in 1998 after a 37-year marriage. His nephew is Adam J. Bass, previously Vice Chairman of Ameriquest.

Political activities
Since 2002, Arnall had given campaign contributions to California politicians including Arnold Schwarzenegger.

In the 2003–05 period, Arnall and his wife raised more than $12 million for George W. Bush's political efforts, including $5 million for the Progress for America Voter Fund, a self-proclaimed "conservative issue advocacy organization dedicated to keeping the issue record straight."   Arnall was quoted as saying his support for Bush stemmed for his stance on Israel.  In 2004 he was one of the top 10 donors to the Republican Party.

Mrs. Arnall also served as a co-chair for the 2004 Republican Convention and hosted a $1 million Bush-Cheney fundraiser at the couple's  home in Holmby Hills. In 2005, Ameriquest Capital and three of its subsidiaries comprised four of the 53 entities that each contributed the maximum of $250,000 to the second inauguration of President George W. Bush.  Writes USA Today, "Inaugural fundraisers Dawn and Roland Arnall found a creative way to pump more than the $250,000 limit into the event. Their mortgage firm, Ameriquest Capital, contributed the maximum, as did three subsidiaries, for a total of $1 million.  The company declined to comment on its political giving."

In order to circumvent campaign finance laws, Arnall mandated that Ameriquest staffers, on company time, solicit campaign contributions from vendors and directed to selected candidates, including Antonio Villaraigosa, Mayor of Los Angeles from 2005 to 2013.

Arnall's contributions to Republican Bush were a change of heart, and the result of Arnall's support for Bush's middle east policies post 9/11. Previously, Arnall was a long-time Democratic Party supporter and fundraiser. His wedding to Dawn Arnall was officiated by Democratic California Governor Gray Davis. Arnall was also an ardent supporter and fundraiser for Los Angeles Mayor Democrat Antonio Villaraigosa.

Last will and testament
SHMAIS.com (Lubavitch News Website) reported that Chabad of California was to be the beneficiary of an $18 million donation from the estate of Roland Arnall. According to their source, before his death, he made arrangements for Rabbi Shlomo Cunin to receive the donation, and a short while later sent in a down payment of $180,000.  Arnall made three payments of $180,000 each to Chabad before dying of cancer in March 2008; after his death, Chabad sought payment for what it said was the balance of his pledge. Arnall's widow, Dawn Arnall, denied that the payments made by her late husband had been part of a pledge.  On January 25, 2013, a California appeals court affirmed a lower court's ruling denying a claim from Chabad of California Inc. of an $18-million pledge that the local Jewish nonprofit group said was promised to it by Arnall.

References

Links
Ameriquest Mortgage Illegal Purchase of Consumer Credit Reports for Target Marketing and Privacy Law Violations
Meet the biggest predatory lender in Cleveland -- America's new ambassador to the Netherlands., Cleveland Scene magazine.
Forbes Magazine top 400 entry for Roland Arnall 
Los Angeles Times: Roland Arnall, 68; founder of subprime specialist Ameriquest
Workers Say Lender Ran 'Boiler Rooms' , Los Angeles Times, February 4, 2005
Embassy Biography

1939 births
2008 deaths
American billionaires
American people of French-Jewish descent
French emigrants to the United States
Businesspeople from Los Angeles
Ambassadors of the United States to the Netherlands
Deaths from cancer in California
California Republicans
American real estate businesspeople
People from Holmby Hills, Los Angeles
20th-century American businesspeople